|- style="vertical-align: top;"
| Distance 
| 1,600 Light-years
|-
! style="background-color: #FFFFC0;" colspan="2" | Binary orbit
|- style="vertical-align: top;"
| Period (P)
| 321.5 seconds
|- style="vertical-align: top;"
| dP/dt (Pdot)
| 1.1 milliseconds per year
|- style="vertical-align: top;"
| Separation:
| 0.0005 AU

The stars are estimated to be about half as massive as the Sun. Like typical white dwarfs, they are extremely dense, being composed of degenerate matter, and so have radii on the order of the Earth's radius. Astronomers believe that the two stars will eventually merge, based on data from many X-ray satellites, such as  Chandra X-Ray Observatory, XMM-Newton and the Swift Gamma-Ray Burst Mission. At this rate, they can be expected to merge in approximately 340,000 years. With a revolution period of 5.4 minutes, HM Cancri is the shortest orbital period binary white dwarf system currently known.

Observations

As HM Cancri is a pair of white dwarfs, it has a relatively low optical luminosity. The 321.5 s modulation of HM Cancri was discovered serendipitously in 1999 thanks to the ROSAT mission  working in the X-ray band. Optical follow-up observations with the ESO  Very Large Telescope (VLT), Telescopio Nazionale Galileo (TNG) and Nordic Optical Telescope (NOT) allowed the counterpart to be identified, a relatively dim (20.7 magnitude in the B filter) object which shows an optical modulation at the same period detected in the X-ray band. The optical monitoring of the counterpart of HM Cancri during 2001-2004 clearly shows that the period is decreasing at a rate of about 1/1000 s each year. This result was confirmed by monitoring the source in the X-rays for several years.

Relation to general relativity
The decreasing separation of the components of the system mean that the system is losing orbital energy.  Albert Einstein's theory of General Relativity predicts such a system will lose orbital energy through the generation of gravitational waves. Scientists believe that HM Cancri may be one of the strongest sources of gravitational waves in the Milky Way galaxy.

Sources

 
 NASA Sees Orbiting Stars Flooding Space With Gravitational Waves
 RX J0806.3+1527: Orbiting Stars Flooding Space with Gravitational Waves

Further reading
 Science Journal: News of the Week
 European southern Observatory Press Release
 RX J0806115: the shortest period binary?
 Simultaneous X-ray UV observations of HM Cnc
 Doppler tomography of RXJ0806
 Phase Resolved Optical spectroscopy of RXJ0806
 RXJ0806 and the unipolar inductor model
 Coherent timing solution for RXJ0806
 Discovery of the 321.5s modulation in RXJ0806
 Spectroscopic optical study of RXJ0806
 Monitoring the spin up in RX J0806+15
 Phase Coherent Timing of RX J0806.3+1527 with ROSAT and Chandra
 RX J0806
 RX J0806.3+1527 Gravitational Wave Merger
 SPECTROSCOPIC EVIDENCE FOR A 5.4-MINUTE ORBITAL PERIOD IN HM CANCRI

Cancer (constellation)
Cancri, HM
ROSAT objects
X-ray binaries
White dwarfs